Bhada is a village in Jafrabad Taluka of Amreli district, Gujarat, India.

History
During the British period, Bhada was under Babariawad before being taken over by Junagadh jurisdiction. The Grasias are Babrias of the Varu subtribe.

References

 This article incorporates text from a publication now in the public domain: 

Villages in Amreli district